KBCZ is a class A radio station broadcasting a community radio format to Boulder Creek, California.

History
KBCZ began broadcasting on July 15, 2016.

See also
List of community radio stations in the United States

References

External links
 

Community radio stations in the United States
2012 establishments in California
BCZ
Radio stations established in 2012